Naushad Moosa (born 10 February 1971) is a former Indian footballer who mostly worked as head coach of Bengaluru FC Reserves and Academy.

During his playing days, Moosa played for East Bengal, Mahindra United, and Mohammedan in the National Football League and I-League. He also represented India from 1994 to 1998.

Playing career
Moosa began his football career as a player with East Bengal F.C. who he played for in the National Football League. On 9 November 1997 Moosa played a part in East Bengal's historic victory over J. League Division 1 side Verdy Kawasaki in the Asian Cup Winners Cup in which a Samuel Omollo's goal in the 61st minute led to East Bengal winning the match 1–0 at the Salt Lake Stadium, however East Bengal were still out of the tournament as Verdy won the first leg of the two-legged event by a score of 5–2. Thirteen days later however, Mossa again made history with East Bengal as he helped the Kolkata club win the IFA Shield over KBL-FC Kochi in which East Bengal won 3–2 at the Salt Lake Stadium.

Moosa's time however at East Bengal officially ended in 1998 when he signed for Mumbai based club, Mahindra & Mahindra. While at Mahindra & Mahindra Moosa failed to reach the same success that he enjoyed at East Bengal. His biggest chance at silverware at Mahindra & Mahindra came on 12 November 2000 when Mahindra & Mahindra were in the final of the 2000 Durand Cup in which they had to face Mohun Bagan but an extra-time golden goal from R.C. Prakash saw the match end in Bagan's favor 2–1.

Coaching career

Air India: 2013
After Godfrey Pereira resigned as head coach of Air India of the I-League, Moosa was signed to replace him in February 2013. His first match in charge took place on 3 March 2013 against ONGC. Despite Air India taking the lead in the 41st minute, ONGC came back to win 2–1. He would fail to get Air India a single victory during his short three months stint with the club as Air India eventually finished 13th, in the relegation zone, at the end of the season.

Pune FC: 2013–16 
Moosa managed youth team of Pune F.C. Under his coaching Pune F.C. Academy won two I-League U20 titles in 2012 and 2013. He also led the team to Pune Football League title in 2016.

Bengaluru FC: 2017–present
On 29 June 2017 it was announced that Moosa would join Bengaluru FC as assistant coach and head coach of the club's reserve side.

On 6 January 2021 after the sacking of Carles Cuadrat, Moosa became the interim head coach of Bengaluru.

On 12 June 2021, Moosa signed a new three year contract with the club, thus allowing the club to keep him till 2024

Statistics

Managerial statistics
.

Honours

India
SAFF Championship: 1997; runner-up: 1995

Maharashtra
Santosh Trophy: 1999–2000

References

1971 births
Living people
Footballers from Maharashtra
Air India FC players
Churchill Brothers FC Goa players
East Bengal Club players
Mahindra United FC players
Mohammedan SC (Kolkata) players
Association football defenders
National Football League (India) players
I-League players
Indian footballers
Indian football managers
I-League managers